Ogwu James Onoja , SAN, (born 19 February 1968) is a legal practitioner and notary public with the Supreme Court of Nigeria. Onoja has authored several publications on legal and social subjects in Nigeria, including The Supreme Court Rules: Practice and Procedure and The Court of Appeal Rules: Practice and Procedure, both published in 2010; the Federal High Court Rules: Practice and Procedure, volumes 1 and 2, published in 2012 and Fundamental Rights (Enforcement Procedure) Rules, 2009 published in 2021.

Birth and education

He proceeded to the School of Basic Studies, Makurdi, Benue State and obtained his Advanced Level Certificate (IJMB) from 1985 – 1987 and thereafter went to the University of Jos, Plateau State where he obtained his Bachelor of Laws, LLB (Hons) degree from 1987 – 1990. From 1990-1991, he was at the Nigerian Law School Lagos Campus for his Barrister at Laws (BL) Certificate which is a postgraduate and compulsory professional qualification to practice law in Nigeria. He was called to the Nigerian Bar on 10 December 1991. He did his compulsory National Youth Service corps at Nkwere Local Government Council in the old Imo State of Nigeria between 1991 – 1992 service years.

Legal career
Onoja was appointed a Notary Public of Nigeria in 2008, while on the 12th day of July 2012, he was elevated to the rank of Senior Advocate of Nigeria (SAN) on the platform of litigation and appearances at all level of courts in Nigeria. The Chief Justice of Nigeria, Walter Onnoghen, on 9 January 2017, appointed Onoja as a member of the Legal Practitioners Privileges Committee (LPPC), the body responsible for the appointment and discipline of Senior Advocates of Nigeria.

 He has offices in Abuja.

References

Living people
Nigerian Christians
20th-century Nigerian lawyers
University of Jos alumni
1968 births
21st-century Nigerian lawyers
Senior Advocates of Nigeria